Father Guy Mary-Rousselière (1913, Le Mans, France – 1994, Pond Inlet, Canada) was a French anthropologist, missionary priest, and collector of string figures. He trained as a priest at the Séminaire Saint-Sulpice (fr), Issy-les-Moulineaux, and whilst there passed the exam to train also as a Sergeant in the French Army Reserve. He was ordained in 1937, his 56 years of ministry being spent in the Canadian Arctic, first with the Dené people in Saskatchewan and Manitoba, then with the Inuit of Repulse Bay (now Naujaat), Pelly, Hudson Bay, and Baffin Island. For the 36 years prior to his death, he lived in Pond Inlet (Mittimatalik).

Mary-Rousselière was involved in the recording of Inuit songs, film-making, and had photographs published occasionally in National Geographic. He excavated numerous artifacts which were given to the National Museum in Ottawa and for many years was the editor of Eskimo magazine (from 1953), as well as being a member of the Northwest Territories Historic Sites and Monuments Board.

In 1988 he received Northern Science Award, which was presented to him by the Honourable Bill McKnight, Minister of Indian Affairs and Northern Development.

Bibliography
 (1965).
 (1969). "Les Jeux de Ficelle des Arviligjuarmiut" [String Figures of Arviligjuarmiut], Musees Nationaux du Canada Bulletin 233.
 (1980). Qitdlarssuaq, l’histoire d’une migration polaire. Université de Montreal.
 (1991). Qitdlarssuaq, the story of a polar migration. Wuerz Publishing. .
 (2008) Qitdlarssuaq, l’histoire d’une migration polaire. Réédition, éditions Paulsen, Paris, .

Filmography

. Light in the Darkness.

References

Canadian anthropologists
French emigrants to Canada
French Roman Catholic missionaries
String figures
1913 births
1994 deaths
Roman Catholic missionaries in Canada
20th-century anthropologists
Missionary Oblates of Mary Immaculate
French Army soldiers